Stictocardia is a genus of flowering plants belonging to the family Convolvulaceae.

Its native range is Tropical and Subtropical Old World to Pacific.

Species:
Stictocardia beraviensis 
Stictocardia cordatosepala 
Stictocardia discolor 
Stictocardia incomta 
Stictocardia laxiflora 
Stictocardia lutambensis 
Stictocardia macalusoi 
Stictocardia mojangensis 
Stictocardia neglecta 
Stictocardia queenslandica 
Stictocardia sivarajanii 
Stictocardia tiliifolia

References

Convolvulaceae
Convolvulaceae genera